Zamia montana is a species of plant in the family Zamiaceae. It is endemic to Antioquia Department, Colombia.  Its natural habitat is subtropical or tropical moist montane forests. Zamia montana is extremely rare and is unknown in cultivation. Its habitat is also extremely threatened by logging activities. In fact, it may well be extinct in the wild because the only known population occurs in an area that was recently logged.

References

montana
Critically endangered plants
Endemic flora of Colombia
Taxonomy articles created by Polbot
Taxa named by Alexander Braun